Tom Whitehouse (born 22 March 1980) is an English professional golfer.

Career
Whitehouse was born in Birmingham and turned professional in 2002. He worked his way through the ranks, winning twice on the third tier PGA EuroPro Tour in 2003 as he led the Order of Merit to earn a place on the Challenge Tour for 2004. He won the Estoril Challenge Open Portugal Telecom that season and finished 24th on the end of season Challenge Tour Rankings. The following year he improved to 17th and at the end of season was medalist at European Tour Qualifying School Final Stage to earn his place at the top level.

In his debit season on the European Tour, Whitehouse finished just inside the top 100 on the Order of Merit having has three top 10 finishes. The following season he had four top 10s but slipped to 100th on the Order of Merit. In 2008 he made just nine cuts and was back on the Challenge Tour in 2009.

Amateur wins
2001 Spanish Amateur Open Championship

Professional wins (4)

Challenge Tour wins (1)

PGA EuroPro Tour wins (2)

Jamega Pro Golf Tour wins (1)

Results in major championships

Note: Whitehouse only played in The Open Championship.

CUT = missed the half-way cut

Team appearances
Amateur
European Boys' Team Championship (representing England): 1997
European Youths' Team Championship (representing England): 2000 (winners)

See also
2005 Challenge Tour graduates
2005 European Tour Qualifying School graduates

References

External links

English male golfers
European Tour golfers
Sportspeople from Birmingham, West Midlands
Sportspeople from Solihull
1980 births
Living people